The 1977 World's Strongest Man was the 1st edition of World's Strongest Man and was held at the Universal Studios, California and took place over ten weeks. The title was won by Bruce Wilhelm from the United States. It was his first title. Bob Young from the United States finished second, and Ken Patera also from the United States third.

Background 
Originally commissioned by Trans World International for CBS, the concept for the World's Strongest Man event came from Scots David P. Webster and Douglas Edmunds. Webster had earned himself a name as an event organiser through his involvement with the Highland games, while Edmunds had experience in professional shot put, discus, and caber tossing. The event was mostly developed for entertainment purposes.

With no precedent for a worldwide 'Strongman' competition, the concept of a strongman competitor and event was new, and as such, the competitors came from a wide range of existing disciplines, including American football, powerlifting and track and field. This meant that none of the competitors had ever trained for the events taking place during the competition.

In addition, several of the events in which the athletes competed were poorly thought out or dangerous, as evidenced when Italian Franco Columbu fell during the penultimate event, the Fridge Race, dislocating his knee, forcing him to retire and putting him out of action for three years. The fridge carry was not reintroduced to the competition until 2004, with a crossbar added to stabilise two fridges on either side of the athlete.

Qualification 
Qualification to the event was by invite only 'on the recommendation of experts.'

Line-Up

Results

References

External links
 Official site

World's Strongest
World's Strongest Man
World's Strongest Man
World's Strongest Man